Pedro Pubill Calaf (24 March 1935 – 27 August 2014), better known as Peret, was a Spanish Romani singer, guitar player and composer of Catalan rumba from Mataró (Barcelona).

Known for his 1971 single, "Borriquito" (Ariola Records), Peret represented Spain at the Eurovision Song Contest 1974 with the song "Canta y sé feliz" and performed during the closing ceremony at the 1992 Summer Olympics in Barcelona. In 2001, Peret recorded and released Rey De La Rumba (King of the Rumba) an album of updated versions of his older songs with guest musicians including Jarabe de Palo, El Gran Silencio, David Byrne of the Talking Heads, and more.

In 1982 Peret withdrew from the music industry, joining the Iglesia Evangélica de Filadelfia, a large religious community of the Spanish Roma (gypsies) devoting himself in the following years exclusively to preaching and religious activities. After leaving the church in 1991, he resumed his music activity and recorded new albums. In 1992, he was honored for all his body of work when he sang as representative of Catalonia at the Olympic Games in Barcelona during the closing ceremonies.

Peret died in Barcelona in 2014 from lung cancer, aged 79.

Discography

Vinyl albums
1967: Peret (Discophon)
1968: Rumba pa'ti (Discophon)
1968: Una lágrima (Vergara)
1969: Lamento gitano (Discophon)
1969: Gipsy Rhumbas (Discophon)
1970: Canta para el cine (Vergara)
1971: Borriquito (Ariola)
1972: Una lágrima (Ariola)
1973: Mi santa (Ariola)
1974: Lo mejor de Peret (Ariola)
1974: Peret y sus gitanos (EMI)
1974: Canta y sé feliz (Ariola)
1978: Saboreando (Ariola)
1978: Lágrimas negras (Ariola)
1978: El joven Peret (CBS)
1980: El jilguero (Belter)
1981: De cap a la palla (Belter)
1988: De coco a la paja (Belter)

CD albums
1991: No se pué aguantar (PDI)* 
1992: Gitana hechicera (PDI)*
1992: Rumbas de la clausura a co-album with Los Manolos and Los Amaya (PDI)*
1993: Cómo me gusta (PDI)*
1995: Que disparen flores (PDI)*
1996: Jesús de Nazareth (PDI)*
2000: Rey de la Rumba (Virgin)
2007: Que levante el dedo (K Industria Cultural)
2009: De los cobardes nunca se ha escrito nada (Universal Music)
*Re-released in 2008 by Picap

Posthumous albums
2014: Des del Respecte / Desde el Respeto (Satélite K)

Compilation albums
1979: El cancionero nº 1 (Belter)
1982: El forat (Impacto) (Cassette release - Side A in Catalan, side B tracks from De cap a la palla and De coco a la paja)
1989: Rumbas de oro (Divucsa)
1990: Peret es la rumba (Ariola)
1994: La vida por delante (Sony/BMG)
1996: Siempre Peret (PDI)
1998: Sus grabaciones en Discophon (Rama Lama/Blanco y Negro)
2000: Don Toribio Carambola (Arcade)
2000: Chica Vaivén (Sony/BMG)
2000: Número 1 en rumba (PDI)
2001: La salsa de la rumba (Sony/BMG)
2004: Singles Collection (Divucsa)
2006: Mano a mano (Divucsa)
2008: Sus 20 grandes éxitos (O.K.)

Singles
(Selective international hits)
1971: "Borriquito"
1971: "Voy voy"
1972: "Ni fu ni fa"
1973: "El mosquito"
1974: "Canta y sé feliz"
1988: "Borriquito" (Mix)

other hits:
1964: "Sapore di sale" / "Salomé" / "Qué suerte" / "Si yo fuera" (Discophon), 1964)
1965: "Jugando" / "Caliente" (Ariola, 1975)
1978: "Saboreando"
1980: "Pa amb oli" / "De cap a la palla" (Belter)
1982: "El forat" / "Estem fotuts"
2001: "Marujas asesinas" (Virgin)

Charts

Filmography
1969: Amor a todo gas1970: El meson del gitano1971: A mi las mujeres ni fu ni fa1973: Que cosas tiene el amor1974: Si fulano fuese menganoVarious supporting roles and extras
1963: Los Tarantos1967: Las cuatro bodas de Marisol1968: El taxi de los conflictos1968: Un dia despues de agosto1969: Alma gitana2001: Marujas asesinas2008: Lazos rotosRelated bibliographyPeret, l'ànima d'un poble., by Cèlia Sànchez-Mústich. Edicions 62 (2005)Peret: Biografía de la Rumba Catalana.'', by Juan Puchades. Global Rhythm Press (2011).

References

External links

Peret performing "El Muerto Vivo" with Ojos de Brujo in 2009

1935 births
2014 deaths
Composers from Catalonia
Musicians from Catalonia
Eurovision Song Contest entrants of 1974
People from Mataró
Eurovision Song Contest entrants for Spain
Spanish guitarists
Spanish male guitarists
Ariola Records artists
Spanish Protestants
Spanish Romani people
Deaths from lung cancer in Spain
20th-century Spanish musicians
Catalan rumba
20th-century guitarists
20th-century Spanish male singers
20th-century Spanish singers
Romani singers